Shapang is a town in Trashigang District in eastern Bhutan.

References

External links
Satellite map at Maplandia.com

Populated places in Bhutan